Sosibius is the name of 
Sosibius, Egyptian politician of the 3rd century BC
Sosibius of Tarentum, Egyptian soldier of the same era
Sosibius, tutor of Britannicus executed on the orders of Agrippina